The High Speed Scene is a power pop band that originated in San Francisco, California but then moved to Hollywood to further their career. They belong to Interscope Records, after being convinced by N.E.R.D., fans of the band themselves. They have been compared to Blondie, Wheatus, and Split Enz.

Members
Max Hart-Vocals - lead guitar
Domen Vajevec - bass guitar
Adam Aaronson - percussion & drums

Discography

References

External links 
 The band's official website

American power pop groups